Nkuutu Memorial Secondary School (NKUMESCO) is a government aided school in  Iganga, Uganda. It is a church founded school and was first established as Busesa girls working together with Busesa boys on the opposite side of the road (now Busesa Mixed Primary School). As the need for a secondary school arose it was expanded into a secondary school and was named in memory of Hon. Shaban Kirunda Nkuutu who was brutally killed during Idi Amin's regime.

Nkuutu Memorial Secondary School (NKUMESCO) has been the place of education for many professionals in the country including journalists, engineers, health workers, and many others.

In 2007 the school was selected to be among the pioneer schools for the Universal Secondary education (USE).

History 
Interior Minister John Mikloth Magoola Luwuliza-Kirunda helped to secure the funding to build the school in the early 1980s.

Notable Former and Current School Administrators
Mrs Ruth Mpaata Isabirye former Head Mistress.

Academics

O-Level
At O-level (S1-S4), the following subjects are offered

 Mathematics
 English
 Chemistry
 Physics
 Biology
 East African History
 Geography
 Advanced Mathematics
 Fine Art
 English Literature
 Commerce
 Christian Religious Education (C.R.E) 
 Music
 Agriculture
 Technical Drawing (TD)

A-Level
 Physics
 Chemistry
 Mathematics
 Biology
 Geography
 Economics
 History
 Divinity
 Literature
 Computer
 sub mathematics

References

Educational institutions with year of establishment missing
Iganga District
Mixed schools in Uganda